Uni Frutti Airport is an airstrip  northeast of Teno, a town in the Maule Region of Chile.

Google Earth Historical Imagery (10/19/2004) shows a  grass strip marked to 850 metres. The 12/31/2012 image shows crop cultivation has cut the unmarked length to 810 metres.

See also

Transport in Chile
List of airports in Chile

References

External links
OpenStreetMap - Unifrutti Airport
OurAirports - Uni Frutti
FallingRain - Uni Frutti Airport

Airports in Chile
Airports in Maule Region